Charles Michael Hackett (1855 – August 1, 1898) was an American professional baseball manager for two seasons in Major League Baseball. First of the 1884 Cleveland Blues National League (NL), then of the Brooklyn Grays in 1885.

References

External links
 Baseball-Reference.com career managing record

1855 births
1898 deaths
Cleveland Blues (NL) managers
Brooklyn Bridegrooms managers
Minor league baseball managers
Sportspeople from Lynn, Massachusetts
Kansas City Blues (baseball) managers